The Abiezar Dean House is a historic house located at 57 Summer Street in Taunton, Massachusetts.

Description and history 
The late Federal Period house was built in 1835, and is a two-story, wood-framed house, five bays wide, with a hipped roof, clapboard siding, and interior end chimneys. Its central entrance is trimmed by a semi-elliptical fanlight and narrow sidelights. The Dean family, for whom it was built, is a locally prominent family of early settlers to the area.

It was added to the National Register of Historic Places on July 5, 1984

See also
National Register of Historic Places listings in Taunton, Massachusetts

References

National Register of Historic Places in Taunton, Massachusetts
Houses in Taunton, Massachusetts
Houses on the National Register of Historic Places in Bristol County, Massachusetts
Federal architecture in Massachusetts
Houses completed in 1835